Nell McCafferty (born 28 March 1944) is an Irish journalist, playwright, civil rights campaigner and feminist. She has written for The Irish Press, The Irish Times, Sunday Tribune, Hot Press and The Village Voice.

Early life

McCafferty was born in Derry, Northern Ireland, to Hugh and Lily McCafferty, and spent her early years in the Bogside area of Derry. She was admitted to Queen's University Belfast (QUB), where she took a degree in Arts. After a brief spell as a substitute English teacher in Northern Ireland and a stint on an Israeli kibbutz, she took up a post with The Irish Times.

Career
McCafferty was a founding member of the Irish Women's Liberation Movement. Her journalistic writing on women and women's rights reflected her beliefs on the status of women in Irish society. In 1970, she wrote that "Women's Liberation is finding it very hard to explain the difference, when you come down to it, except in terms of physical make-up. And men are as different as women, which no-one holds against them. It's the system which divides. Break the system, unite the people."

In 1971, she travelled to Belfast with other members of the Irish Women's Liberation Movement in order to protest the prohibition of the importation and sale of contraceptives in the Republic of Ireland. The incident, which attracted extensive publicity, became known as the Contraceptive Train.

After the disintegration of the Irish Women's Liberation Movement, McCafferty remained active in other women's rights groups, as well as focusing her journalism on women's rights. Her most notable work is her coverage of the Kerry Babies case, which is recorded in her book, A Woman to Blame.

McCafferty contributed the piece "Coping with the womb and the border" to the 1984 anthology Sisterhood Is Global: The International Women's Movement Anthology, edited by Robin Morgan.

In 1990, McCafferty won a Jacob's Award for her reports on the 1990 World Cup for RTÉ Radio 1's The Pat Kenny Show. McCafferty lives in Ranelagh, an area of Dublin. McCafferty published her autobiography, Nell, in 2004. In it, she explores her upbringing in Derry, her relationship with her parents, her fears about being gay, the joy of finding a domestic haven with the love of her life, the Irish writer Nuala O'Faolain, and the pain of losing it.

In 2009, after the publication of the Murphy Report into the abuse of children in the Dublin archdiocese, McCafferty confronted Archbishop Diarmuid Martin asking him why the Catholic Church had not, as a "gesture of redemption", relinquished titles such as "Your Eminence" and "Your Grace."

McCafferty caused a controversy in 2010 with a declaration in a live Newstalk radio interview that the then Minister for Health, Mary Harney, was an alcoholic. This allegation led to a court case in which Harney was awarded €450,000 the following year. McCafferty has very rarely featured on live radio or television in Ireland as a commentator since the incident, despite being ever present in those media from 1990 onwards.  However, she has been featured on a number of recorded shows.

The Irish Times wrote that "Nell's distinctive voice, both written and spoken, has a powerful and provocative place in Irish society."

McCafferty received an honorary doctorate of literature from University College Cork on 2 November 2016 for "her unparalleled contribution to Irish public life over many decades and her powerful voice in movements that have had a transformative impact in Irish society, including the feminist movement, campaigns for civil rights and for the marginalised and victims of injustice".

Personal life
McCafferty was in a fifteen-year relationship with the late journalist Nuala O'Faolain.

Bibliography 
 A Woman to Blame - the Kerry Babies Case
 Peggy Deery: A Derry Family at War 
 Nell. Penguin, 2004.
 Goodnight Sisters: Selected Writings of Nell McCafferty. Attic Press, Dublin, 1987.
 Goodnight, Sisters...: Selected Writings, Volume Two. Attic Press, Dublin, 1987.

References

External links
 "Coping With the Womb and the Border", by Nell McCafferty, in Sisterhood Is Global: The International Women's Movement Anthology, edited by Robin Morgan (1984)

1944 births
21st-century writers from Northern Ireland
Atheists from Northern Ireland
Hot Press people
Irish birth control activists
Irish dramatists and playwrights
Irish lesbian writers
Irish schoolteachers
Irish women dramatists and playwrights
Irish women journalists
Irish women's rights activists
Jacob's Award winners
LGBT broadcasters from Northern Ireland
LGBT dramatists and playwrights from Northern Ireland
Irish LGBT journalists
Irish LGBT rights activists
Lesbian dramatists and playwrights
Lesbian feminists
Living people
People from Ranelagh
Radio personalities from the Republic of Ireland
Sunday Tribune people
The Irish Press people
The Irish Times people
Women civil rights activists
Writers from Derry (city)